This is a list of Japanese football transfers in the summer transfer window 2012 by club.

J. League Division 1

Albirex Niigata 

In:

Out:

Kashima Antlers 

In:

Out:

Omiya Ardija 

In:

Out:

Cerezo Osaka 

In:

Out:

Consadole Sapporo 

In

Out

Yokohama F. Marinos 

In:

Out:

Kawasaki Frontale 

In

Out

Gamba Osaka 

In:

Out:

Nagoya Grampus 

In:

Out:

Júbilo Iwata 

In:

Out:

Urawa Red Diamonds 

In

Out

Kashiwa Reysol 

In:

Out:

Shimizu S-Pulse 

In:

Out:

Sagan Tosu 

In:

Out:

Sanfrecce Hiroshima 

In:

Out:

F.C. Tokyo 

In

Out

Vegalta Sendai 

In

Out

Vissel Kobe 

In:

Out:

J. League Division 2

Avispa Fukuoka 

In

Out

Shonan Bellmare 

In

Out

Ehime F.C. 

In

Out

Fagiano Okayama 

In

Out

Gainare Tottori 

In:

Out:

F.C. Gifu 

In

Out

Giravanz Kitakyushu 

In

Out

Mito HollyHock 

In

Out

JEF United Chiba 

In

Out

Kataller Toyama 

In

Out

Montedio Yamagata 

In

Out

Roasso Kumamoto 

In

Out

Kyoto Sanga F.C. 

In

Out

Thespa Kusatsu 

In

Out

Tochigi S.C. 

In

Out

Oita Trinita 

In

Out

Ventforet Kofu 

In

Out

Tokyo Verdy 

In

Out

Tokushima Vortis 

In

Out

Matsumoto Yamaga 

In

Out

Yokohama F.C. 

In

Out

Machida Zelvia 

In

Out

References 

Transfers
2012
Japan